The Parrot's Theorem is a French novel written by Denis Guedj and published in 1998. An English translation was published in 2000.

Plot summary

The plot revolves around a household in Paris: Mr Ruche, an elderly wheelchair-using bookseller, his employee and housemate Perrette, and Perrette's three children – teenage twins and young Max, who is deaf. Max liberates a talking parrot at the market and Mr Ruche receives a consignment of mathematical books from an old friend, who has lived in Brazil for decades without any contact between the two.

The household sets up its own exploration of mathematics in order to crack the code of the last messages from Mr Ruche's old friend, now apparently murdered. Mathematical topics covered in the book include primes and factors; irrational and amicable numbers; the discoveries of Pythagoras, Archimedes and Euclid; and the problems of squaring the circle and doubling the cube.

The mathematics is real mathematics, woven into an historical sequence as a series of intriguing problems, bringing their own stories with them.

See also

 Forrest Library
 Numbers: The Universal Language

References
Imaginary numbers, A review of The Parrot's Theorem by Simon Singh.

1998 French novels
Books about birds
Fictional parrots
Novels about mathematics
Novels set in Paris
Weidenfeld & Nicolson books